The Tyrone Constitution is a newspaper based in Omagh, County Tyrone, Northern Ireland. It is published by the Alpha Newspaper Group. It describes itself as "The traditional newspaper for Omagh and district since 1844".

The Tyrone Constitution was established in 1844, the oldest newspaper
in the county, and one of the longest-running in Northern Ireland. It circulates in a wide area of Tyrone, stretching from the Clogher
Valley in the South to the Sperrin Mountains in the North and also
penetrates into North Fermanagh.
Omagh, the market county town of Tyrone, is at the heart of the
circulation area and where the newspaper's editorial and advertising
offices are sited.
Although covering a largely rural area, there are significant
business and commercial centres dotted throughout the sprawling
circulation area.
The Constitution has long been known for its in-depth coverage of
community life and issues that concern the local populace. This was
recognised when it received the Northern Ireland and UK Weekly
Newspaper of the Year accolade in 1999.

References

External links
www.tyronecon.co.uk

Newspapers published in Northern Ireland
Mass media in County Tyrone
Omagh
1844 establishments in Ireland
Publications established in 1844